The MGR-1 Honest John rocket was the first nuclear-capable surface-to-surface rocket in the United States arsenal. Originally designated Artillery Rocket XM31, the first unit was tested on 29 June 1951, with the first production rounds delivered in January 1953. Its designation was changed to M31 in September 1953. The first Army units received their rockets by year's end and Honest John battalions were deployed in Europe in early 1954. Alternatively, the rocket was capable of carrying an ordinary high-explosive warhead weighing .

History and development

Developed at Redstone Arsenal, Alabama, the Honest John was a large but simple fin-stabilized, unguided artillery rocket weighing  in its initial M31 nuclear-armed version. Mounted on the back of a truck, the rocket was aimed in much the same way as a cannon and then fired up an elevated ramp, igniting four small spin rockets as it cleared the end of the ramp.

The M31 system included a truck-mounted, unguided, solid-fueled rocket transported in three separate parts. The Honest John was assembled in the field before launch, mounted on an M289 launcher, and aimed and fired in about 5 minutes. There was a W31 variant of  used exclusively for the Nike Hercules anti-aircraft system.

Early tests exhibited more scatter on target than was acceptable when carrying conventional payloads. Development of an upgraded Honest John, M50, was undertaken to improve accuracy and extend range. The size of the fins was greatly reduced to eliminate weathercocking. Increased spin was applied to restore the positive stability margin that was lost when fin size was reduced. The improved M50, with the smaller fins and more "rifling", had a maximum range of 30+ miles with a scatter on target of only , demonstrating an accuracy approaching that of tube artillery. The Honest John was manufactured by the Douglas Aircraft Company of Santa Monica, California.

In the 1960s, sarin nerve gas cluster munitions were also available, designed to be interchangeable for use with either the Honest John or MGM-5 Corporal. Initially the M79 (E19R1) GB cluster warhead, containing 356 M134 (E130R1) bomblets for the M31A1C Honest John. The production model was the M190 (E19R2) GB cluster warhead, containing 356 M139 (E130R2) bomblets when the M31A1C was phased out in favor of the XM50 Honest John. Under nominal conditions it had an mean area of effect of 0.9 square kilometers.

Variants 
The two basic versions of Honest John were: 

An improved propellant formulation gave the rocket motor  thrust.

Production and deployment 
Production of the MGR-1 variants finished in 1965, with a total production run of more than 7,000 rockets. The Honest John's bulbous nose and distinctive truck-mounted launch ramp made it an easily recognized symbol of the Cold War at army bases worldwide and National Guard armories in the U.S.. Even though it was unguided and the first U.S. nuclear ballistic missile, it had a longer service life than all other U.S. ballistic missiles except the Minuteman system. The system was replaced with the MGM-52 Lance missile in 1973, but was deployed with the National Guard units in the United States as late as 1983. Conventionally armed Honest Johns remained in the arsenals of Greece, Turkey and South Korea until at least the late 1990s.

By the time the last Honest Johns were withdrawn from Europe in the late 1980s (and replaced by the unguided M-26 artillery rocket), the rocket had served with the military forces of Belgium, Britain, Canada, Denmark (non-nuclear), France, Germany, Greece, Italy, the Netherlands, Norway (non-nuclear), South Korea, Taiwan (non-nuclear), and Turkey.

Name origin
In late 1950, Major General Holger Toftoy was a colonel overseeing the development of the rocket. The project was in danger of cancellation "on the grounds that such a large unguided rocket could not possibly have had the accuracy to justify further funds." On a trip to White Sands Missile Range, Toftoy met a Texan man who was prone to making unbelievable statements. Whenever anyone expressed doubt about the man's claims, he would respond, "Why, around these parts, I'm called 'Honest John!'" Because the project was being questioned, Toftoy felt that the nickname was appropriate for the rocket and suggested the name to his superiors.

Support vehicles

Vehicles used with the Honest John platform:
 M33 trailer, launcher,
 M46 truck, heating and tie down unit (G744)
 M289 truck, rocket launcher, (M139 truck) (G744),
 M329 trailer, rocket transporter, (G821)
 M386 Truck, Rocket, 762mm, short launch rail, 5-ton (M139 truck)
 M405 handling unit, trailer mounted,
 M465 cart assembly, transport, 762mm rocket,

Surviving examples

Canada
CFB Petawawa Military Museum, CFB Petawawa, Petawawa, Ontario.
The Central Museum of The Royal Regiment of Canadian Artillery, Shilo Manitoba

Denmark
The Royal Danish Arsenal Museum

Netherlands
The National Military Museum

United Kingdom
Imperial War Museum Duxford
Royal Air Force Museum

United States

3rd Cavalry Museum, 1st Cav Museum, Fort Hood, Texas
45th Infantry Museum, Oklahoma City, Oklahoma
Air Force Space & Missile Museum, Cape Canaveral Air Force Station, Florida
American Armoured Foundation, Inc. Tank & Ordnance War Memorial Museum, Danville, Virginia
Bedford, Indiana, displayed outside a military surplus store, at the southwest corner of US-50/IN-37 and IN-450.
Camp Atterbury Military Museum, Camp Atterbury, Indiana.
Carolinas Aviation Museum, Charlotte, North Carolina (Two missiles are on display – both came from the Florence Air & Missile Museum)
Crestwood, Illinois, on display at municipal park.
Combat Air Museum, Topeka, Kansas
Fort Lewis Museum, Fort Lewis, Washington
Field Artillery Museum, Fort Sill, Oklahoma
National Atomic Museum, Kirtland AFB, Albuquerque, New Mexico
Rock Island Arsenal, Arsenal Island, between Iowa and Illinois
Texas Military Forces Museum at Camp Mabry, Austin, Texas
Underwood Public School, Underwood, Minnesota.
United States Space & Rocket Center, Huntsville, Alabama
Yuma Proving Ground, Yuma, Arizona
 Milledgeville High School, Milledgeville, Illinois (home of the Milledgeville Missiles)
 Miami Central High School Miami, Florida Home of the "ROCKETS".
 A.C. Reynolds High School Asheville, North Carolina Home of the "ROCKETS".
Outdoor display, Spokane, Washington – southwest corner of Sanson and Market in Hillyard neighborhood
Outdoor display, St. Albans Roadside Park, St. Albans, West Virginia
Outdoor display, White Sands Missile Range Museum, New Mexico
Neenah High School, Neenah, Wisconsin
Outdoor display, M50 from 6th Bn 112th FA on display at the Armory in Cape May Courthouse, Cape May, New Jersey.
Outdoor display, Hull Street Outlet Inc., Richmond, Virginia.
Outdoor display, Trumann Middle School, Trumann, Arkansas

Operators

Former operators

Belgian Army
Used in various Corps and Divisional artillery units (75, 3, 20 and 14th Artillery Battalions) from 1960 to 1978. Replaced by Lance missile.

Canadian Army

Canada adopted the MGR-1B with the 1-kiloton W31 warhead. Four units were assigned to 1 Surface to Surface Missile Battery, Royal Canadian Artillery at Hemer, Germany under 4 CIBG. Two to four units were supplied to 2 SSM Battery at CFB Shilo in Manitoba for training. These units were formed in September 1960. 1SSM maintained very high readiness and able to deploy to firing positions quickly. Their ability to maintain camouflage kept even elite NATO special forces from locating them in exercises. 1SSM was authorized to wear the black scarf of the Congreve rocket gunners. Canada disbanded the Honest John batteries in mid-1970 without replacement.

Royal Danish Army

French Army
Corps Artillery
301st Artillery Group [Battalion] (1959–1970) – absorbed into 50th Artillery Regiment
50th Artillery Regiment (1970–1976)
302nd Artillery Group [Battalion] (1959–1970) – absorbed into 60th Artillery Regiment
60th Artillery Regiment (1970–1975)
303rd Artillery Group [Battalion] (1960–1970) – absorbed into 3rd Artillery Regiment
3rd Artillery Regiment (1970–1973)
Divisional Artillery
3rd Group, 32nd Artillery Regiment (1962–1974)
3rd Group, 68th Artillery Regiment (1960–1973)
Nuclear Security
351st Artillery Group (1962–1970) – expanded to 351st Artillery Regiment
351st Artillery Regiment (1970–1975)

German Army

Hellenic Army

Italian Army

Republic of Korea Army

Norwegian Army (1961–65)

Royal Netherlands Army

Republic of China Army

Turkish Army - in service with 420th, 450th, 490th, and 550th Battalions, 1963. 

British Army - 24 Missile Regiment RA 1960/61 - 1977; 39 Missile Regiment RA; 50 Missile Regiment Royal Artillery, both 8" inch towed, two batteries, and two batteries Honest John. 

United States Army
United States Marine Corps

See also
 W7
 W31
 M139 bomblet
 G-numbers
 MGR-3 Little John

Notes

References

Models
Meccano Ltd. U.K. in its Dinky Toys range produced a model of the International Harvester Honest John missile launcher under the reference 665.

External links

http://www.designation-systems.net/dusrm/r-1.html
https://web.archive.org/web/20041011052933/http://www.astronautix.com/lvs/hontjohn.htm
Redstone Arsenal (Alabama) (includes declassified military monograph on the Honest John, chronology, pictures, and a movie of an Honest John firing) 
Weapons of the Field Artillery – Part 3, U.S. Military Documentary, Film TF6 3646, 1965 
Honest John Missile Base in Germany http://www.herzobase.org
 http://www.olive-drab.com/idphoto/id_photos_m39_missiletrk.php launchers
 MGR-1A & MGR-1B Honest John Operator & Organisation Maintenance Manual. US Army issue to troops. 

Unguided nuclear rockets of the United States
Cold War missiles of the United States
Surface-to-surface missiles of the United States
Nuclear artillery
Cold War weapons of the United States
Nuclear weapons of the United States
Cluster munition
Nuclear weapons of Canada
Chemical weapon delivery systems
Military equipment introduced in the 1950s